Clinidium haitiense is a species of ground beetle in the subfamily Rhysodinae. It was described by R.T.Bell in 1970. It is known from La Selle Range in Haiti. Clinidium haitiense measure  in length.

References

Clinidium
Beetles of North America
Insects of Haiti
Endemic fauna of Haiti
Beetles described in 1970